Use of mind-altering substances in warfare has included drugs used for relaxation and stimulation. Historically, drug use was often sanctioned and encouraged by militaries through including alcohol and tobacco in troop rations. Stimulants like cocaine and amphetamines were widely used in both World Wars to increase alertness and suppress appetite. Drug use can negatively affect combat readiness and reduce the performance of troops. Drug use also poses additional expenses to the health care systems of militaries.

Drugs

Alcohol
Alcohol has a long association of military use, and has been called "liquid courage" for its role in preparing troops for battle. It has also been used to anaesthetize injured soldiers, celebrate military victories, and cope with the emotions of defeat. In the Russo-Japanese War, alcohol has been implicated as a factor contributing to the Russian Empire's loss. Russian commanders, sailors, and soldiers were said to be drunk more than sober. Countries often enabled alcohol use by their troops through providing alcohol in their rations. The British Royal Navy and other Commonwealth navies once maintained a rum ration for sailors until Britain retired it in 1970. The Royal Canadian Navy followed suit in 1972 as did the Royal New Zealand Navy in 1990. The United States Navy similarly provided a distilled spirits ration between 1794 and 1862 when Secretary of the Navy Gideon Welles removed most non-medicinal alcohol from U.S. naval vessels, with all alcohol consumption aboard ship banned in 1914.  

There is a strong association of military service and alcohol use disorder. In 1862, British soldiers in India responded to the threat of problematic alcohol use by establishing the Soldiers' Total Abstinence Association, which became the Army Temperance Association in 1888. Similar organizations formed in other branches of military and for British troops stationed in other colonies. Members of these abstinence associations were encouraged to sign pledges to avoid alcohol entirely. Medals were awarded to individuals who remained abstinent. Studies show that Australian Defence Force veterans of the Gulf War had a prevalence of alcohol use disorder higher than any other psychological disorder; British Armed Forces veterans of modern conflicts in Iraq and Afghanistan had higher rates of alcohol use disorder than servicemembers who were not deployed.

Amphetamines

Amphetamines were given to troops to increase alertness. They had the added benefits of reducing appetites and fatigue. Nazi Germany, in particular, embraced amphetamines during World War II. From April to July 1940, German service members on the Western Front received more than 35 million methamphetamine pills. German troops would go as many as three days without sleep during the invasion of France. In contrast, Britain distributed 72 million amphetamine tablets during the entire war.

Caffeine
Military use has contributed to the rise of caffeine as the world's most popular drug. During the American Civil War, each Union troop received a coffee ration of  annually.

Cannabis 

In the 1910s U.S. Army soldiers stationed in the Panama Canal Zone and in the Pancho Villa Expedition began using cannabis. Although the drug became illegal to use on bases, the U.S. Army Medical Corps prepared the 1933 report Mariajuana Smoking in Panama for the Panama Canal Department recommending no further restrictions. Between 1948 and 1975 the U.S. Army Chemical Corps also tested chemical agents, including cannabinoids considered for "nonlethal incapacitating agents," to volunteering soldiers in the Edgewood Arsenal human experiments. During the Vietnam War American soldiers frequently used cannabis. A 1971 U.S. Department of Defense report claimed that over half of U.S. Armed Forces personnel had used the drug. Beginning in 1968 this led to a political scandal in America that led the Nixon administration to more tightly restrict drug use in the military as part of the War on Drugs, requiring all returning soldiers to pass a clinical urine test in Operation Golden Flow. 

After the passage of the Cannabis Act legalizing the recreational use of the drug in Canada in 2018, its use became legal for most active-duty Canadian Armed Forces personnel with restrictions against its use eight hours before duty, 24 hours before handling a loaded weapon, and 28 days before entering an aircraft or submarine.

Cocaine
World War I saw the greatest use of cocaine amongst militaries. It was used for medical purposes and as a performance enhancer. At the time, it was not a controlled substance, and was readily available to troops. The British Army distributed cocaine-containing pills under Tabloid's brand name "Forced March", which were advertised to suppress appetite and increase endurance. In response to a moral panic about the effects of cocaine on society, the British Army Council passed an order in 1916 that prohibited the unauthorized sale of psychoactive drugs like cocaine and opiates to service members. 
The German Army for its part, also produced during the closing days of World War II a combination of 5 mg of Cocaine, 3 mg of Methamphetamine and 5 mg of Oxycodone in a compound they named D-IX; the compound was reportedly tested on prisoners at the Sachsenhausen concentration camp and found out an individual who had consumed the compound could march 90 kilometers per day without rest while carrying 20 kilograms of equipment. The doctors and military authorities testing the compound were enthusiastic about the results but the war ended before the compound could be mass produced and distributed.

Hallucinogens
The 16th century Spanish Franciscan scholar Bernardino de Sahagún wrote that the Chichimeca people of Mexico consumed the root of the peyote, a cactus, to stimulate themselves for battle. In his 1887 Historia del Nayarit (English: History of Nayarit), José Ortego also wrote that it was a favorite stimulant in warfare. It has been speculated that berserkers, who were Old Norse warriors, used the hallucinogenic mushroom Amanita muscaria to enter a trance-like state before battle. Karsten Fatur thought it was plausible that instead of A. muscaria, berserkers consumed the plant Hyoscyamus niger (known as henbane or stinking nightshade). While both A. muscaria and H. niger can result in delirious behavior, twitching, increased strength, and redness of the face, H. niger is additionally known to have pain-numbing properties.

Opiates
During the American Civil War, opiates were the most effective painkillers available to military surgeons. They were also used to treat diarrhea, muscle spasms of amputees, gangrene, dysentery, inflammation from gunshot wounds, and to sedate agitated troops. The Union Army requisitioned 5.3–10 million opium pills throughout the war, and a further 2.8 million ounces of opiate preparation (such as laudanum). Many veterans of the war had opiate addictions. Opiate addiction became known as "soldier's disease" and "army disease", though the precise effect of the American Civil War on the overall prevalence of opiate addiction is unknown. As a result of World War I, hundreds of thousands of soldiers developed severe opiate addictions, as morphine was commonly used to treat injuries.

Tobacco

Tobacco has been viewed as essential to maintaining the morale of troops. Starting with the Thirty Years' War in 17th century Europe, major military encounters caused a surge in tobacco usage, mostly stemming from soldiers' use. During World War I, US Army General John J. Pershing noted, "You ask me what we need to win this war. I answer tobacco as much as bullets. Tobacco is as indispensable as the daily ration; we must have thousands of tons without delay." This sentiment was echoed by US Army General George Goethals, who noted tobacco was as important as food, and US medical officer William Gorgas who said that tobacco promoted contentment and morale, and the benefits outweighed any potential health risks. Such was the tobacco consumption of its troops that the US Government became the single-largest purchaser of cigarettes, including cigarettes in troops' rations and at discounted prices at post exchanges.

Health and social impacts
Heavy drinking, tobacco use, and use of illegal drugs are common in the US military. Alcohol consumption in the US Military is higher than any other profession, according to CDC data from 2013–2017. American troops spend more days per year consuming alcohol than those in other professions (130 days), and additionally spend more days binge-drinking than those of other professions (41 days). Substance-use disorders were often attributed to moral failure, with the US Supreme Court ruling as recently as 1988 that the Department of Veterans Affairs did not have to pay benefits to alcoholics, as drinking was a result of "willful misconduct". Substance use can adversely affect combat readiness, with tobacco use negatively impacting troop performance and readiness. It can also be costly: In 2006, the cost of tobacco use to the Military Health System $564 million.

The Department of Defense Survey of Health Related Behaviors among Active Duty Military Personnel published that 47% of active duty members engage in binge drinking, with another 20% engaging in heavy drinking in the past 30 days. 11% of respondents engages in prescription drug misuse. Lastly, 30% reported to smoke tobacco, and 10% would smoke one or more packs of cigarettes daily.

After the service members come back from deployments, they go through a post deployment screening, screening them for alcohol, drugs, and mental health disorders. They have to repeat the screening again in a couple of weeks to make sure they are stable afterwards. There is no prolonged treatment necessary to the service members if their screenings come back clear. So, many of the service members disorders go unnoticed because they are able to hide their issues during the screening only, then carry on afterwards. 

The amount of substance use disorders diagnosed in the military is significantly lower than any other mental health disorder. This is because many of the clinicians providing these screenings are also service members, and they are aware of the stigma and consequences of a SUD or AUD diagnosis in the military. This is also because of the lack of screening and clinicians available, and they usually only catch a SUD or AUD when the veteran is coming in for another mental illness, such as PTSD.

See also 
 Drug policy of Nazi Germany
 List of psychoactive drugs used by militaries
 Smoking in the United States military

References 

Psychoactive drugs and the military
Alcohol and the military
Tobacco and the military